Brightview is a locality split between the Lockyer Valley Region and Somerset Region, Queensland, Australia.

Geography
Brightview is a rural locality. The larger north-eastern part is in Somerset Region and is mostly used for farming; that part is in the federal electorate of Blair. The smaller south-western part in Lockyer Valley Region is more residential in character; that part is in the federal electorate of Wright.

The northern boundary is Lockyer Creek.

History 

Brightview was originally named Tarampa Flats and then Lobethal. It is thought the present name was the name of a pastoral property owned by Ernest Christian Frederick Beutel.

Tarampa Flat Provisional School  opened on 25 November 1902, being renamed Brightview Provisional School in 1906. It became Brightview State School on 1 January 1909. It closed on 11 May 1962.

It is unclear when the Apostolic church opened, but an Apostolic congregation was already established in Tarampa Flats by 1911.

Amenities 

The Apostolic Church of Queensland has a church and adjoining cemetery at 22 Thorne Street just off Brightview Road.

References

Further reading
 — contains information about Brightview State School

External links

Lockyer Valley Region
Suburbs of Somerset Region
Localities in Queensland